Fantazia could refer to:

Fantazia, a dance music organisation based in the United Kingdom
Fantazia (novel series), a series of books by Egyptian writer Ahmed Khaled Towfik
Fantázia,  a Slovak science fiction, fantasy, and horror magazine

See also
Fantasia (disambiguation)
Fantazaki